In applied probability, a Markov additive process (MAP) is a bivariate Markov process where the future states depends only on one of the variables.

Definition

Finite or countable state space for J(t)

The process  is a Markov additive process with continuous time parameter t if

  is a Markov process

The state space of the process is R × S where X(t) takes real values and J(t) takes values in some countable set S.

General state space for J(t)

For the case where J(t) takes a more general state space the evolution of X(t) is governed by J(t) in the sense that for any f and g we require

.

Example

A fluid queue is a Markov additive process where J(t) is a continuous-time Markov chain.

Applications

Çinlar uses the unique structure of the MAP to prove that, given a gamma process with a shape parameter that is a function of Brownian motion, the resulting lifetime is distributed according to the Weibull distribution.

Kharoufeh presents a compact transform expression for the failure distribution for wear processes of a component degrading according to a Markovian environment inducing state-dependent continuous linear wear by using the properties of a MAP and assuming the wear process to be temporally homogeneous and that the environmental process has a finite state space.

Notes

Markov processes